"The Beginning" is a song by British singer and songwriter Seal, released as the third single from his debut album, Seal (1991). The song was edited for the UK release, but the US release saw a completely new remix produced for the single. It was a top 20 hit in Finland, Ireland and the Netherlands. In the UK, it peaked at number 24.

Critical reception
Pan-European magazine Music & Media wrote, "For being a newcomer, this man turned into a household name in no time. This third single off his self-titled album, and follow-up to Future Love Paradise is tuneful, soulful and full of good grooves."

Formats and track listings
 Maxi CD single
"The Beginning" – 4:09
"The Beginning" (Giro e Giro mix) – 6:06
"The Beginning" (remix) – 5:41
"Deep Water" (acoustic) – 3:43
"We Love Morocco" – 8:18

 7" single
"The Beginning" – 4:09
"Deep Water" (acoustic) – 3:43

 US CD single
"The Beginning" (US remix) – 4:46
"The Beginning" (Roundabout mix) – 9:06
"The Beginning" (Round the Underground mix) – 7:30
"Deep Water" (acoustic version) – 3:42
"The Beginning" (UK remix) – 7:04
"The Beginning" (Giro e Giro mix) – 6:05
"The Beginning" (Round the Underground dub) – 5:48

Charts

References

1991 singles
1991 songs
Seal (musician) songs
Songs written by Seal (musician)
Songs written by Guy Sigsworth
Song recordings produced by Trevor Horn
ZTT Records singles